Vamo is a census-designated place (CDP) in Sarasota County, Florida, United States. The population was 4,727 at the 2010 census. It is part of the Bradenton–Sarasota–Venice Metropolitan Statistical Area.

Geography
Vamo is located at  (27.225978, -82.495568).

History

Vamo was founded by the Webb family in 1928. They established the first home in the neighborhood on the Sarasota Bay Inlet off what is now known as Vamo Drive. This area is famous for its historic Spanish style homes. The name "Vamo" originated from the home states of Mr. and Mrs. Webb: Mrs. Webb was born in Virginia (VA), and Mr. Webb was born in Missouri (MO). There is also a street in the neighborhood named Mova Street.

Demographics

As of the census of 2000, there were 5,285 people, 2,516 households, and 1,335 families residing in the CDP. The racial makeup of the CDP was 96.90% White, 0.72% African American, 0.17% Native American, 1.10% Asian, 0.42% from other races, and 0.70% from two or more races. Hispanic or Latino of any race were 3.56% of the population.

There were 2,516 households, out of which 16.5% had children under the age of 18 living with them, 42.4% were married couples living together, 7.5% had a female householder with no husband present, and 46.9% were non-families. 38.7% of all households were made up of individuals, and 17.7% had someone living alone who was 65 years of age or older.  The average household size was 1.92 and the average family size was 2.52.

In the CDP, the population was spread out, with 13.4% under the age of 18, 5.9% from 18 to 24, 25.0% from 25 to 44, 21.2% from 45 to 64, and 34.5% who were 65 years of age or older.  The median age was 50 years. For every 100 females, there were 81.6 males.  For every 100 females age 18 and over, there were 77.2 males.

The median income for a household in the CDP was $45,945, and the median income for a family was $53,041. Males had a median income of $39,030 versus $27,800 for females. The per capita income for the CDP was $32,068.  About 4.1% of families and 5.6% of the population were below the poverty line, including 8.7% of those under age 18 and 1.5% of those age 65 or over.

References

Census-designated places in Sarasota County, Florida
Sarasota metropolitan area
Populated places on the Intracoastal Waterway in Florida
Former municipalities in Florida